Evgeniia Pavlovna Golovina (born 14 July 1999) is a Russian water polo player. She competed in the 2020 Summer Olympics.

References

External links
Profile on the RWPF

1999 births
Living people
People from Zlatoust
European Games gold medalists for Russia
Water polo players at the 2015 European Games
European Games medalists in water polo
Water polo players at the 2020 Summer Olympics
Russian female water polo players
Water polo goalkeepers
Olympic water polo players of Russia
Sportspeople from Chelyabinsk Oblast
21st-century Russian women